Jason Turner may refer to:

Jason Turner (figure skater) (born 1971), Olympic figure skater
Jason Turner (sport shooter) (born 1975), Olympic sport shooter
Jason Turner (cartoonist) (born 1970), Canadian cartoonist
Jason Turner (drummer), American drummer of the band Pavement